is a Japanese professional boxer.

Professional boxing record

External links 

1985 births
Living people
Japanese male boxers
Super-flyweight boxers
21st-century Japanese people